

A

Abbeville County, South Carolina
Acadia Parish, Louisiana
Accomack County, Virginia
Ada County, Idaho
Adair County:  Iowa; Kentucky; Missouri; Oklahoma
Adams County:  Colorado; Idaho; Illinois; Indiana; Iowa; Mississippi; Nebraska; North Dakota; Ohio; Pennsylvania; Washington; Wisconsin
Addison County, Vermont
Adjuntas Municipality, Puerto Rico
Aguada Municipality, Puerto Rico
Aguadilla Municipality, Puerto Rico
Aguas Buenas Municipality, Puerto Rico
Aibonito Municipality, Puerto Rico
Aiken County, South Carolina
Aitkin County, Minnesota
Alachua County, Florida
Alamance County, North Carolina
Alameda County, California
Alamosa County, Colorado
Albany County:  New York; Wyoming
Albemarle County, Virginia
Alcona County, Michigan
Alcorn County, Mississippi
Aleutians East Borough, Alaska
Aleutians West Census Area, Alaska
Alexander County:  Illinois; North Carolina
Alfalfa County, Oklahoma
Alger County, Michigan
Allamakee County, Iowa
Allegan County, Michigan
Allegany County:  Maryland; New York
Alleghany County:  North Carolina; Virginia
Allegheny County, Pennsylvania
Allen County:  Indiana; Kansas; Kentucky; Ohio
Allen Parish, Louisiana
Allendale County, South Carolina
Alpena County, Michigan
Alpine County, California
Amador County, California
Amelia County, Virginia
Amherst County, Virginia
Amite County, Mississippi
Añasco Municipality, Puerto Rico
Municipality of Anchorage, Alaska (a consolidated city-borough under Alaska law)
Anderson County:  Kansas; Kentucky; South Carolina; Tennessee; Texas
Andrew County, Missouri
Andrews County, Texas
Androscoggin County, Maine
Angelina County, Texas
Anne Arundel County, Maryland
Anoka County, Minnesota
Anson County, North Carolina
Antelope County, Nebraska
Antrim County, Michigan
Apache County, Arizona
Appanoose County, Iowa
Appling County, Georgia
Appomattox County, Virginia
Aransas County, Texas
Arapahoe County, Colorado
Archer County, Texas
Archuleta County, Colorado
Arecibo Municipality, Puerto Rico
Arenac County, Michigan
Arkansas County, Arkansas
Arlington County, Virginia
Armstrong County:  Pennsylvania; Texas
Aroostook County, Maine
Arroyo Municipality, Puerto Rico
Arthur County, Nebraska
Ascension Parish, Louisiana
Ashe County, North Carolina
Ashland County:  Ohio; Wisconsin
Ashley County, Arkansas
Ashtabula County, Ohio
Asotin County, Washington
Assumption Parish, Louisiana
Atascosa County, Texas
Atchison County:  Kansas; Missouri
Athens County, Ohio
Atkinson County, Georgia
Atlantic County, New Jersey
Atoka County, Oklahoma
Attala County, Mississippi
Audrain County, Missouri
Audubon County, Iowa
Auglaize County, Ohio
Augusta County, Virginia
Aurora County, South Dakota
Austin County, Texas
Autauga County, Alabama
Avery County, North Carolina
Avoyelles Parish, Louisiana

B

Baca County, Colorado
Bacon County, Georgia
Bailey County, Texas
Baker County:  Florida; Georgia; Oregon
Baker Island, U.S. Minor Outlying Islands
Baldwin County:  Alabama; Georgia
Ballard County, Kentucky
Baltimore County, Maryland
Bamberg County, South Carolina
Bandera County, Texas
Banks County, Georgia
Banner County, Nebraska
Bannock County, Idaho
Baraga County, Michigan
Barber County, Kansas
Barbour County:  Alabama; West Virginia
Barceloneta Municipality, Puerto Rico
Barnes County, North Dakota
Barnstable County, Massachusetts
Barnwell County, South Carolina
Barranquitas Municipality, Puerto Rico
Barren County, Kentucky
Barron County, Wisconsin
Barrow County, Georgia
Barry County:  Michigan; Missouri
Bartholomew County, Indiana
Barton County:  Kansas; Missouri
Bartow County, Georgia
Bastrop County, Texas
Bates County, Missouri
Bath County:  Kentucky; Virginia
Baxter County, Arkansas
Bay County:  Florida; Michigan
Bayamón Municipality, Puerto Rico
Bayfield County, Wisconsin
Baylor County, Texas
Beadle County, South Dakota
Bear Lake County, Idaho
Beaufort County:  North Carolina; South Carolina
Beauregard Parish, Louisiana
Beaver County:  Oklahoma; Pennsylvania; Utah
Beaverhead County, Montana
Becker County, Minnesota
Beckham County, Oklahoma
Bedford County:  Pennsylvania; Tennessee; Virginia
Bee County, Texas
Belknap County, New Hampshire
Bell County:  Kentucky; Texas
Belmont County, Ohio
Beltrami County, Minnesota
Ben Hill County, Georgia
Benewah County, Idaho
Bennett County, South Dakota
Bennington County, Vermont
Benson County, North Dakota
Bent County, Colorado
Benton County:  Arkansas; Indiana; Iowa; Minnesota; Mississippi; Missouri; Oregon; Tennessee; Washington
Benzie County, Michigan
Bergen County, New Jersey
Berkeley County:  South Carolina; West Virginia
Berks County, Pennsylvania
Berkshire County, Massachusetts
Bernalillo County, New Mexico
Berrien County:  Georgia; Michigan
Bertie County, North Carolina
Bethel Census Area, Alaska
Bexar County, Texas
Bibb County:  Alabama; Georgia
Bienville Parish, Louisiana
Big Horn County:  Montana; Wyoming
Big Stone County, Minnesota
Billings County, North Dakota
Bingham County, Idaho
Black Hawk County, Iowa
Blackford County, Indiana
Bladen County, North Carolina
Blaine County:  Idaho; Montana; Nebraska; Oklahoma
Blair County, Pennsylvania
Blanco County, Texas
Bland County, Virginia
Bleckley County, Georgia
Bledsoe County, Tennessee
Blount County:  Alabama; Tennessee
Blue Earth County, Minnesota
Boise County, Idaho
Bolivar County, Mississippi
Bollinger County, Missouri
Bon Homme County, South Dakota
Bond County, Illinois
Bonner County, Idaho
Bonneville County, Idaho
Boone County:  Arkansas; Illinois; Indiana; Iowa; Kentucky; Missouri; Nebraska; West Virginia
Borden County, Texas
Bosque County, Texas
Bossier Parish, Louisiana
Botetourt County, Virginia
Bottineau County, North Dakota
Boulder County, Colorado
Boundary County, Idaho
Bourbon County:  Kansas; Kentucky
Bowie County, Texas
Bowman County, North Dakota
Box Butte County, Nebraska
Box Elder County, Utah
Boyd County:  Kentucky; Nebraska
Boyle County, Kentucky
Bracken County, Kentucky
Bradford County:  Florida; Pennsylvania
Bradley County:  Arkansas; Tennessee
Branch County, Michigan
Brantley County, Georgia
Braxton County, West Virginia
Brazoria County, Texas
Brazos County, Texas
Breathitt County, Kentucky
Breckinridge County, Kentucky
Bremer County, Iowa
Brevard County, Florida
Brewster County, Texas
Briscoe County, Texas
Bristol Bay Borough, Alaska
Bristol County:  Massachusetts; Rhode Island
Broadwater County, Montana
Bronx County, New York
Brooke County, West Virginia
Brookings County, South Dakota
Brooks County:  Georgia; Texas
Broome County, New York
City and County of Broomfield, Colorado
Broward County, Florida
Brown County:  Illinois; Indiana; Kansas; Minnesota; Nebraska; Ohio; South Dakota; Texas; Wisconsin
Brule County, South Dakota
Brunswick County:  North Carolina; Virginia
Bryan County:  Georgia; Oklahoma
Buchanan County:  Iowa; Missouri; Virginia
Buckingham County, Virginia
Bucks County, Pennsylvania
Buena Vista County, Iowa
Buffalo County:  Nebraska; South Dakota; Wisconsin
Bullitt County, Kentucky
Bulloch County, Georgia
Bullock County, Alabama
Buncombe County, North Carolina
Bureau County, Illinois
Burke County:  Georgia; North Carolina; North Dakota
Burleigh County, North Dakota
Burleson County, Texas
Burlington County, New Jersey
Burnet County, Texas
Burnett County, Wisconsin
Burt County, Nebraska
Butler County:  Alabama; Iowa; Kansas; Kentucky; Missouri; Nebraska; Ohio; Pennsylvania
Butte County:  California; Idaho; South Dakota
Butts County, Georgia

C

Cabarrus County, North Carolina
Cabell County, West Virginia
Cabo Rojo Municipality, Puerto Rico
Cache County, Utah
Caddo County, Oklahoma
Caddo Parish, Louisiana
Caguas Municipality, Puerto Rico
Calaveras County, California
Calcasieu Parish, Louisiana
Caldwell County:  Kentucky; Missouri; North Carolina; Texas
Caldwell Parish, Louisiana
Caledonia County, Vermont
Calhoun County:  Alabama; Arkansas; Florida; Georgia; Illinois; Iowa; Michigan; Mississippi; South Carolina; Texas; West Virginia
Callahan County, Texas
Callaway County, Missouri
Calloway County, Kentucky
Calumet County, Wisconsin
Calvert County, Maryland
Camas County, Idaho
Cambria County, Pennsylvania
Camden County:  Georgia; Missouri; New Jersey; North Carolina
Cameron County:  Pennsylvania; Texas
Cameron Parish, Louisiana
Camp County, Texas
Campbell County:  Kentucky; South Dakota; Tennessee; Virginia; Wyoming
Camuy Municipality, Puerto Rico
Canadian County, Oklahoma
Candler County, Georgia
Cannon County, Tennessee
Canóvanas Municipality, Puerto Rico
Canyon County, Idaho
Cape Girardeau County, Missouri
Cape May County, New Jersey
Carbon County:  Montana; Pennsylvania; Utah; Wyoming
Caribou County, Idaho
Carlisle County, Kentucky
Carlton County, Minnesota
Carolina Municipality, Puerto Rico
Caroline County:  Maryland; Virginia
Carroll County:  Arkansas; Georgia; Illinois; Indiana; Iowa; Kentucky; Maryland; Mississippi; Missouri; New Hampshire; Ohio; Tennessee; Virginia
Carson County, Texas
Carter County:  Kentucky; Missouri; Montana; Oklahoma; Tennessee
Carteret County, North Carolina
Carver County, Minnesota
Cascade County, Montana
Casey County, Kentucky
Cass County:  Illinois; Indiana; Iowa; Michigan; Minnesota; Missouri; Nebraska; North Dakota; Texas
Cassia County, Idaho
Castro County, Texas
Caswell County, North Carolina
Catahoula Parish, Louisiana
Cataño Municipality, Puerto Rico
Catawba County, North Carolina
Catoosa County, Georgia
Catron County, New Mexico
Cattaraugus County, New York
Cavalier County, North Dakota
Cayey Municipality, Puerto Rico
Cayuga County, New York
Cecil County, Maryland
Cedar County:  Iowa; Missouri; Nebraska
Ceiba Municipality, Puerto Rico
Centre County, Pennsylvania
Cerro Gordo County, Iowa
Chaffee County, Colorado
Chambers County:  Alabama; Texas
Champaign County:  Illinois; Ohio
Chariton County, Missouri
Charles City County, Virginia
Charles County, Maryland
Charles Mix County, South Dakota
Charleston County, South Carolina
Charlevoix County, Michigan
Charlotte County:  Florida; Virginia
Charlton County, Georgia
Chase County:  Kansas; Nebraska
Chatham County:  Georgia; North Carolina
Chattahoochee County, Georgia
Chattooga County, Georgia
Chautauqua County:  Kansas; New York
Chaves County, New Mexico
Cheatham County, Tennessee
Cheboygan County, Michigan
Chelan County, Washington
Chemung County, New York
Chenango County, New York
Cherokee County:  Alabama; Georgia; Iowa; Kansas; North Carolina; Oklahoma; South Carolina; Texas
Cherry County, Nebraska
Cheshire County, New Hampshire
Chester County:  Pennsylvania; South Carolina; Tennessee
Chesterfield County:  South Carolina; Virginia
Cheyenne County:  Colorado; Kansas; Nebraska
Chickasaw County:  Iowa; Mississippi
Chicot County, Arkansas
Childress County, Texas
Chilton County, Alabama
Chippewa County:  Michigan; Minnesota; Wisconsin
Chisago County, Minnesota
Chittenden County, Vermont
Choctaw County:  Alabama; Mississippi; Oklahoma
Chouteau County, Montana
Chowan County, North Carolina
Christian County:  Illinois; Kentucky; Missouri
Chugach Census Area, Alaska
Churchill County, Nevada
Ciales Municipality, Puerto Rico
Cibola County, New Mexico
Cidra Municipality, Puerto Rico
Cimarron County, Oklahoma
Citrus County, Florida
Clackamas County, Oregon
Claiborne County:  Mississippi; Tennessee
Claiborne Parish, Louisiana
Clallam County, Washington
Clare County, Michigan
Clarendon County, South Carolina
Clarion County, Pennsylvania
Clark County:  Arkansas; Idaho; Illinois; Indiana; Kansas; Kentucky; Missouri; Nevada; Ohio; South Dakota; Washington; Wisconsin
Clarke County:  Alabama; Georgia; Iowa; Mississippi; Virginia
Clatsop County, Oregon
Clay County:  Alabama; Arkansas; Florida; Georgia; Illinois; Indiana; Iowa; Kansas; Kentucky; Minnesota; Mississippi; Missouri; Nebraska; North Carolina; South Dakota; Tennessee; Texas; West Virginia
Clayton County:  Georgia; Iowa
Clear Creek County, Colorado
Clearfield County, Pennsylvania
Clearwater County:  Idaho; Minnesota
Cleburne County:  Alabama; Arkansas
Clermont County, Ohio
Cleveland County:  Arkansas; North Carolina; Oklahoma
Clinch County, Georgia
Clinton County:  Illinois; Indiana; Iowa; Kentucky; Michigan; Missouri; New York; Ohio; Pennsylvania
Cloud County, Kansas
Coahoma County, Mississippi
Coal County, Oklahoma
Coamo Municipality, Puerto Rico
Cobb County, Georgia
Cochise County, Arizona
Cochran County, Texas
Cocke County, Tennessee
Coconino County, Arizona
Codington County, South Dakota
Coffee County:  Alabama; Georgia; Tennessee
Coffey County, Kansas
Coke County, Texas
Colbert County, Alabama
Cole County, Missouri
Coleman County, Texas
Coles County, Illinois
Colfax County:  Nebraska; New Mexico
Colleton County, South Carolina
Collier County, Florida
Collin County, Texas
Collingsworth County, Texas
Colorado County, Texas
Colquitt County, Georgia
Columbia County:  Arkansas; Florida; Georgia; New York; Oregon; Pennsylvania; Washington; Wisconsin
Columbiana County, Ohio
Columbus County, North Carolina
Colusa County, California
Comal County, Texas
Comanche County:  Kansas; Oklahoma; Texas
Comerío Municipality, Puerto Rico
Concho County, Texas
Concordia Parish, Louisiana
Conecuh County, Alabama
Conejos County, Colorado
Contra Costa County, California
Converse County, Wyoming
Conway County, Arkansas
Cook County:  Georgia; Illinois; Minnesota
Cooke County, Texas
Cooper County, Missouri
Coos County, Oregon
Coös County, New Hampshire
Coosa County, Alabama
Copiah County, Mississippi
Copper River Census Area, Alaska
Corozal Municipality, Puerto Rico
Corson County, South Dakota
Cortland County, New York
Coryell County, Texas
Coshocton County, Ohio
Costilla County, Colorado
Cottle County, Texas
Cotton County, Oklahoma
Cottonwood County, Minnesota
Covington County:  Alabama; Mississippi
Coweta County, Georgia
Cowley County, Kansas
Cowlitz County, Washington
Craig County:  Oklahoma; Virginia
Craighead County, Arkansas
Crane County, Texas
Craven County, North Carolina
Crawford County:  Arkansas; Georgia; Illinois; Indiana; Iowa; Kansas; Michigan; Missouri; Ohio; Pennsylvania; Wisconsin
Creek County, Oklahoma
Crenshaw County, Alabama
Crisp County, Georgia
Crittenden County:  Arkansas; Kentucky
Crockett County:  Tennessee; Texas
Crook County:  Oregon; Wyoming
Crosby County, Texas
Cross County, Arkansas
Crow Wing County, Minnesota
Crowley County, Colorado
Culberson County, Texas
Culebra Municipality, Puerto Rico
Cullman County, Alabama
Culpeper County, Virginia
Cumberland County:  Illinois; Kentucky; Maine; New Jersey; North Carolina; Pennsylvania; Tennessee; Virginia
Cuming County, Nebraska
Currituck County, North Carolina
Curry County: New Mexico; Oregon
Custer County: Colorado; Idaho; Montana; Nebraska; Oklahoma; South Dakota
Cuyahoga County, Ohio

D

Dade County: Georgia; Missouri; (Florida)
Daggett County, Utah
Dakota County: Minnesota; Nebraska
Dale County, Alabama
Dallam County, Texas
Dallas County: Alabama; Arkansas; Iowa; Missouri; Texas
Dane County, Wisconsin
Daniels County, Montana
Dare County, North Carolina
Darke County, Ohio
Darlington County, South Carolina
Dauphin County, Pennsylvania
Davidson County: North Carolina; Tennessee
Davie County, North Carolina
Daviess County: Indiana; Kentucky; Missouri
Davis County:  Iowa; Utah
Davison County, South Dakota
Dawes County, Nebraska
Dawson County:  Georgia; Montana; Nebraska; Texas
Day County, South Dakota
De Baca County, New Mexico
DeKalb County:  Alabama; Georgia; Illinois; Indiana; Missouri; Tennessee
De Soto Parish, Louisiana
DeSoto County:  Florida; Mississippi
De Witt County, Illinois
DeWitt County, Texas
Deaf Smith County, Texas
Dearborn County, Indiana
Decatur County:  Georgia; Indiana; Iowa; Kansas; Tennessee
Deer Lodge County, Montana
Defiance County, Ohio
Del Norte County, California
Delaware County:  Indiana; Iowa; New York; Ohio; Oklahoma; Pennsylvania
Delta County:  Colorado; Michigan; Texas
Denali Borough, Alaska
Dent County, Missouri
Denton County, Texas
City and County of Denver, Colorado
Des Moines County, Iowa
Deschutes County, Oregon
Desha County, Arkansas
Deuel County:  Nebraska; South Dakota
Dewey County:  Oklahoma; South Dakota
Dickens County, Texas
Dickenson County, Virginia
Dickey County, North Dakota
Dickinson County:  Iowa; Kansas; Michigan
Dickson County, Tennessee
Dillingham Census Area, Alaska
Dillon County, South Carolina
Dimmit County, Texas
Dinwiddie County, Virginia
District of Columbia
Divide County, North Dakota
Dixie County, Florida
Dixon County, Nebraska
Doddridge County, West Virginia
Dodge County:  Georgia; Minnesota; Nebraska; Wisconsin
Dolores County, Colorado
Doña Ana County, New Mexico
Doniphan County, Kansas
Donley County, Texas
Dooly County, Georgia
Door County, Wisconsin
Dorado Municipality, Puerto Rico
Dorchester County:  Maryland; South Carolina
Dougherty County, Georgia
Douglas County:  Colorado; Georgia; Illinois; Kansas; Minnesota; Missouri; Nebraska; Nevada; Oregon; South Dakota; Washington; Wisconsin
Drew County, Arkansas
DuPage County, Illinois
Dubois County, Indiana
Dubuque County, Iowa
Duchesne County, Utah
Dukes County, Massachusetts
Dundy County, Nebraska
Dunklin County, Missouri
Dunn County:  North Dakota; Wisconsin
Duplin County, North Carolina
Durham County, North Carolina
Dutchess County, New York
Duval County:  Florida; Texas
Dyer County, Tennessee

E

Eagle County, Colorado
Early County, Georgia
East Baton Rouge Parish, Louisiana
East Carroll Parish, Louisiana
East Feliciana Parish, Louisiana
Eastern District, American Samoa
Eastland County, Texas
Eaton County, Michigan
Eau Claire County, Wisconsin
Echols County, Georgia
Ector County, Texas
Eddy County:  New Mexico; North Dakota
Edgar County, Illinois
Edgecombe County, North Carolina
Edgefield County, South Carolina
Edmonson County, Kentucky
Edmunds County, South Dakota
Edwards County:  Illinois; Kansas; Texas
Effingham County:  Georgia; Illinois
El Dorado County, California
El Paso County:  Colorado; Texas
Elbert County:  Colorado; Georgia
Elk County:  Kansas; Pennsylvania
Elkhart County, Indiana
Elko County, Nevada
Elliott County, Kentucky
Ellis County:  Kansas; Oklahoma; Texas
Ellsworth County, Kansas
Elmore County:  Alabama; Idaho
Emanuel County, Georgia
Emery County, Utah
Emmet County:  Iowa; Michigan
Emmons County, North Dakota
Erath County, Texas
Erie County:  New York; Ohio; Pennsylvania
Escambia County:  Alabama; Florida
Esmeralda County, Nevada
Essex County:  Massachusetts; New Jersey; New York; Vermont; Virginia
Estill County, Kentucky
Etowah County, Alabama
Eureka County, Nevada
Evangeline Parish, Louisiana
Evans County, Georgia

F

Fairbanks North Star Borough, Alaska
Fairfax County, Virginia
Fairfield County:  Connecticut; Ohio; South Carolina
Fajardo Municipality, Puerto Rico
Fall River County, South Dakota
Fallon County, Montana
Falls County, Texas
Fannin County:  Georgia; Texas
Faribault County, Minnesota
Faulk County, South Dakota
Faulkner County, Arkansas
Fauquier County, Virginia
Fayette County:  Alabama; Georgia; Illinois; Indiana; Iowa; Kentucky; Ohio; Pennsylvania; Tennessee; Texas; West Virginia
Fentress County, Tennessee
Fergus County, Montana
Ferry County, Washington
Fillmore County:  Minnesota; Nebraska
Finney County, Kansas
Fisher County, Texas
Flagler County, Florida
Flathead County, Montana
Fleming County, Kentucky
Florence County:  South Carolina; Wisconsin
Florida Municipality, Puerto Rico
Floyd County:  Georgia; Indiana; Iowa; Kentucky; Texas; Virginia
Fluvanna County, Virginia
Foard County, Texas
Fond du Lac County, Wisconsin
Ford County:  Illinois; Kansas
Forest County:  Pennsylvania; Wisconsin
Forrest County, Mississippi
Forsyth County:  Georgia; North Carolina
Fort Bend County, Texas
Foster County, North Dakota
Fountain County, Indiana
Franklin County:  Alabama; Arkansas; Florida; Georgia; Idaho; Illinois; Indiana; Iowa; Kansas; Kentucky; Maine; Massachusetts; Mississippi; Missouri; Nebraska; New York; North Carolina; Ohio; Pennsylvania; Tennessee; Texas; Vermont; Virginia; Washington
Franklin Parish, Louisiana
Frederick County:  Maryland; Virginia
Freeborn County, Minnesota
Freestone County, Texas
Fremont County:  Colorado; Idaho; Iowa; Wyoming
Fresno County, California
Frio County, Texas
Frontier County, Nebraska
Fulton County:  Arkansas; Georgia; Illinois; Indiana; Kentucky; New York; Ohio; Pennsylvania
Furnas County, Nebraska

G

Gadsden County, Florida
Gage County, Nebraska
Gaines County, Texas
Gallatin County:  Illinois; Kentucky; Montana
Gallia County, Ohio
Galveston County, Texas
Garden County, Nebraska
Garfield County:  Colorado; Montana; Nebraska; Oklahoma; Utah; Washington
Garland County, Arkansas
Garrard County, Kentucky
Garrett County, Maryland
Garvin County, Oklahoma
Garza County, Texas
Gasconade County, Missouri
Gaston County, North Carolina
Gates County, North Carolina
Geary County, Kansas
Geauga County, Ohio
Gem County, Idaho
Genesee County:  Michigan; New York
Geneva County, Alabama
Gentry County, Missouri
George County, Mississippi
Georgetown County, South Carolina
Gibson County:  Indiana; Tennessee
Gila County, Arizona
Gilchrist County, Florida
Giles County:  Tennessee; Virginia
Gillespie County, Texas
Gilliam County, Oregon
Gilmer County:  Georgia; West Virginia
Gilpin County, Colorado
Glacier County, Montana
Glades County, Florida
Gladwin County, Michigan
Glascock County, Georgia
Glasscock County, Texas
Glenn County, California
Gloucester County:  New Jersey; Virginia
Glynn County, Georgia
Gogebic County, Michigan
Golden Valley County:  Montana; North Dakota
Goliad County, Texas
Gonzales County, Texas
Goochland County, Virginia
Goodhue County, Minnesota
Gooding County, Idaho
Gordon County, Georgia
Goshen County, Wyoming
Gosper County, Nebraska
Gove County, Kansas
Grady County:  Georgia; Oklahoma
Grafton County, New Hampshire
Graham County:  Arizona; Kansas; North Carolina
Grainger County, Tennessee
Grand County:  Colorado; Utah
Grand Forks County, North Dakota
Grand Isle County, Vermont
Grand Traverse County, Michigan
Granite County, Montana
Grant County:  Arkansas; Indiana; Kansas; Kentucky; Minnesota; Nebraska; New Mexico; North Dakota; Oklahoma; Oregon; South Dakota; Washington; West Virginia; Wisconsin
Grant Parish, Louisiana
Granville County, North Carolina
Gratiot County, Michigan
Graves County, Kentucky
Gray County:  Kansas; Texas
Grays Harbor County, Washington
Grayson County:  Kentucky; Texas; Virginia
Greeley County:  Kansas; Nebraska
Green County:  Kentucky; Wisconsin
Green Lake County, Wisconsin
Greenbrier County, West Virginia
Greene County:  Alabama; Arkansas; Georgia; Illinois; Indiana; Iowa; Mississippi; Missouri; New York; North Carolina; Ohio; Pennsylvania; Tennessee; Virginia
Greenlee County, Arizona
Greensville County, Virginia
Greenup County, Kentucky
Greenville County, South Carolina
Greenwood County:  Kansas; South Carolina
Greer County, Oklahoma
Gregg County, Texas
Gregory County, South Dakota
Grenada County, Mississippi
Griggs County, North Dakota
Grimes County, Texas
Grundy County:  Illinois; Iowa; Missouri; Tennessee
Guadalupe County:  New Mexico; Texas
Guam
Guánica Municipality, Puerto Rico
Guayama Municipality, Puerto Rico
Guayanilla Municipality, Puerto Rico
Guaynabo Municipality, Puerto Rico
Guernsey County, Ohio
Guilford County, North Carolina
Gulf County, Florida
Gunnison County, Colorado
Gurabo Municipality, Puerto Rico
Guthrie County, Iowa
Gwinnett County, Georgia

H

Haakon County, South Dakota
Habersham County, Georgia
Haines Borough, Alaska
Hale County:  Alabama; Texas
Halifax County:  North Carolina; Virginia
Hall County:  Georgia; Nebraska; Texas
Hamblen County, Tennessee
Hamilton County:  Florida; Illinois; Indiana; Iowa; Kansas; Nebraska; New York; Ohio; Tennessee; Texas
Hamlin County, South Dakota
Hampden County, Massachusetts
Hampshire County:  Massachusetts; West Virginia
Hampton County, South Carolina
Hancock County:  Georgia; Illinois; Indiana; Iowa; Kentucky; Maine; Mississippi; Ohio; Tennessee; West Virginia
Hand County, South Dakota
Hanover County, Virginia
Hansford County, Texas
Hanson County, South Dakota
Haralson County, Georgia
Hardee County, Florida
Hardeman County:  Tennessee; Texas
Hardin County:  Illinois; Iowa; Kentucky; Ohio; Tennessee; Texas
Harding County:  New Mexico; South Dakota
Hardy County, West Virginia
Harford County, Maryland
Harlan County:  Kentucky; Nebraska
Harmon County, Oklahoma
Harnett County, North Carolina
Harney County, Oregon
Harper County:  Kansas; Oklahoma
Harris County:  Georgia; Texas
Harrison County:  Indiana; Iowa; Kentucky; Mississippi; Missouri; Ohio; Texas; West Virginia
Hart County:  Georgia; Kentucky
Hartford County, Connecticut
Hartley County, Texas
Harvey County, Kansas
Haskell County:  Kansas; Oklahoma; Texas
Hatillo Municipality, Puerto Rico
Hawaiʻi County, Hawaii
Hawkins County, Tennessee
Hayes County, Nebraska
Hays County, Texas
Haywood County:  North Carolina; Tennessee
Heard County, Georgia
Hemphill County, Texas
Hempstead County, Arkansas
Henderson County:  Illinois; Kentucky; North Carolina; Tennessee; Texas
Hendricks County, Indiana
Hendry County, Florida
Hennepin County, Minnesota
Henrico County, Virginia
Henry County:  Alabama; Georgia; Illinois; Indiana; Iowa; Kentucky; Missouri; Ohio; Tennessee; Virginia
Herkimer County, New York
Hernando County, Florida
Hertford County, North Carolina
Hettinger County, North Dakota
Hickman County:  Kentucky; Tennessee
Hickory County, Missouri
Hidalgo County:  New Mexico; Texas
Highland County:  Ohio; Virginia
Highlands County, Florida
Hill County:  Montana; Texas
Hillsborough County:  Florida; New Hampshire
Hillsdale County, Michigan
Hinds County, Mississippi
Hinsdale County, Colorado
Hitchcock County, Nebraska
Hocking County, Ohio
Hockley County, Texas
Hodgeman County, Kansas
Hoke County, North Carolina
Holmes County:  Florida; Mississippi; Ohio
Holt County:  Missouri; Nebraska
Honolulu County, Hawaii
Hood County, Texas
Hood River County, Oregon
Hooker County, Nebraska
Hopkins County:  Kentucky; Texas
Hormigueros Municipality, Puerto Rico
Horry County, South Carolina
Hot Spring County, Arkansas
Hot Springs County, Wyoming
Houghton County, Michigan
Houston County:  Alabama; Georgia; Minnesota; Tennessee; Texas
Howard County:  Arkansas; Indiana; Iowa; Maryland; Missouri; Nebraska; Texas
Howell County, Missouri
Howland Island, U.S. Minor Outlying Islands
Hubbard County, Minnesota
Hudson County, New Jersey
Hudspeth County, Texas
Huerfano County, Colorado
Hughes County:  Oklahoma; South Dakota
Humacao Municipality, Puerto Rico
Humboldt County:  California; Iowa; Nevada
Humphreys County:  Mississippi; Tennessee
Hunt County, Texas
Hunterdon County, New Jersey
Huntingdon County, Pennsylvania
Huntington County, Indiana
Huron County:  Michigan; Ohio
Hutchinson County:  South Dakota; Texas
Hyde County:  North Carolina; South Dakota

I

Iberia Parish, Louisiana
Iberville Parish, Louisiana
Ida County, Iowa
Idaho County, Idaho
Imperial County, California
Independence County, Arkansas
Indian River County, Florida
Indiana County, Pennsylvania
Ingham County, Michigan
Inyo County, California
Ionia County, Michigan
Iosco County, Michigan
Iowa County:  Iowa; Wisconsin
Iredell County, North Carolina
Irion County, Texas
Iron County:  Michigan; Missouri; Utah; Wisconsin
Iroquois County, Illinois
Irwin County, Georgia
Isabela Municipality, Puerto Rico
Isabella County, Michigan
Isanti County, Minnesota
Island County, Washington
Isle of Wight County, Virginia
Issaquena County, Mississippi
Itasca County, Minnesota
Itawamba County, Mississippi
Izard County, Arkansas

J

Jack County, Texas
Jackson County:  Alabama; Arkansas; Colorado; Florida; Georgia; Illinois; Indiana; Iowa; Kansas; Kentucky; Michigan; Minnesota; Mississippi; Missouri; North Carolina; Ohio; Oklahoma; Oregon; South Dakota; Tennessee; Texas; West Virginia; Wisconsin
Jackson Parish, Louisiana
James City County, Virginia
Jarvis Island, U.S. Minor Outlying Islands
Jasper County:  Georgia; Illinois; Indiana; Iowa; Mississippi; Missouri; South Carolina; Texas
Jay County, Indiana
Jayuya Municipality, Puerto Rico
Jeff Davis County:  Georgia; Texas
Jefferson County:  Alabama; Arkansas; Colorado; Florida; Georgia; Idaho; Illinois; Indiana; Iowa; Kansas; Kentucky; Mississippi; Missouri; Montana; Nebraska; New York; Ohio; Oklahoma; Oregon; Pennsylvania; Tennessee; Texas; Washington; West Virginia; Wisconsin
Jefferson Parish, Louisiana
Jefferson Davis County, Mississippi
Jefferson Davis Parish, Louisiana
Jenkins County, Georgia
Jennings County, Indiana
Jerauld County, South Dakota
Jerome County, Idaho
Jersey County, Illinois
Jessamine County, Kentucky
Jewell County, Kansas
Jim Hogg County, Texas
Jim Wells County, Texas
Jo Daviess County, Illinois
Johnson County:  Arkansas; Georgia; Illinois; Indiana; Iowa; Kansas; Kentucky; Missouri; Nebraska; Tennessee; Texas; Wyoming
Johnston Atoll, U.S. Minor Outlying Islands
Johnston County:  North Carolina; Oklahoma
Jones County:  Georgia; Iowa; Mississippi; North Carolina; South Dakota; Texas
Josephine County, Oregon
Juab County, Utah
Juana Díaz Municipality, Puerto Rico
Judith Basin County, Montana
Juncos Municipality, Puerto Rico
Juneau County, Wisconsin
Juneau City and Borough, Alaska
Juniata County, Pennsylvania

K

Kalamazoo County, Michigan
Kalawao County, Hawaii
Kalkaska County, Michigan
Kanabec County, Minnesota
Kanawha County, West Virginia
Kandiyohi County, Minnesota
Kane County:  Illinois; Utah
Kankakee County, Illinois
Karnes County, Texas
Kauai County, Hawaii
Kaufman County, Texas
Kay County, Oklahoma
Kearney County, Nebraska
Kearny County, Kansas
Keith County, Nebraska
Kemper County, Mississippi
Kenai Peninsula Borough, Alaska
Kendall County:  Illinois; Texas
Kenedy County, Texas
Kennebec County, Maine
Kenosha County, Wisconsin
Kent County:  Delaware; Maryland; Michigan; Rhode Island; Texas
Kenton County, Kentucky
Keokuk County, Iowa
Kern County, California
Kerr County, Texas
Kershaw County, South Carolina
Ketchikan Gateway Borough, Alaska
Kewaunee County, Wisconsin
Keweenaw County, Michigan
Keya Paha County, Nebraska
Kidder County, North Dakota
Kimball County, Nebraska
Kimble County, Texas
King County:  Texas; Washington
King George County, Virginia
King William County, Virginia
King and Queen County, Virginia
Kingfisher County, Oklahoma
Kingman County, Kansas
Kingman Reef, U.S. Minor Outlying Islands
Kings County: California; New York
Kingsbury County, South Dakota
Kinney County, Texas
Kiowa County:  Colorado; Kansas; Oklahoma
Kit Carson County, Colorado
Kitsap County, Washington
Kittitas County, Washington
Kittson County, Minnesota
Klamath County, Oregon
Kleberg County, Texas
Klickitat County, Washington
Knott County, Kentucky
Knox County:  Illinois; Indiana; Kentucky; Maine; Missouri; Nebraska; Ohio; Tennessee; Texas
Kodiak Island Borough, Alaska
Koochiching County, Minnesota
Kootenai County, Idaho
Kosciusko County, Indiana
Kossuth County, Iowa
Kusilvak Census Area, Alaska

L

La Crosse County, Wisconsin
LaMoure County, North Dakota
La Paz County, Arizona
La Plata County, Colorado
LaPorte County, Indiana
LaSalle County, Illinois
La Salle County, Texas
La Salle Parish, Louisiana
Labette County, Kansas
Lac qui Parle County, Minnesota
Lackawanna County, Pennsylvania
Laclede County, Missouri
Lafayette County:  Arkansas; Florida; Mississippi; Missouri; Wisconsin
Lafayette Parish, Louisiana
Lafourche Parish, Louisiana
LaGrange County, Indiana
Lajas Municipality, Puerto Rico
Lake County:  California; Colorado; Florida; Illinois; Indiana; Michigan; Minnesota; Montana; Ohio; Oregon; South Dakota; Tennessee
Lake and Peninsula Borough, Alaska
Lake of the Woods County, Minnesota
Lamar County:  Alabama; Georgia; Mississippi; Texas
Lamb County, Texas
Lamoille County, Vermont
Lampasas County, Texas
Lancaster County:  Nebraska; Pennsylvania; South Carolina; Virginia
Lander County, Nevada
Lane County:  Kansas; Oregon
Langlade County, Wisconsin
Lanier County, Georgia
Lapeer County, Michigan
Laramie County, Wyoming
Lares Municipality, Puerto Rico
Larimer County, Colorado
LaRue County, Kentucky
Las Animas County, Colorado
Las Marías Municipality, Puerto Rico
Las Piedras Municipality, Puerto Rico
Lassen County, California
Latah County, Idaho
Latimer County, Oklahoma
Lauderdale County:  Alabama; Mississippi; Tennessee
Laurel County, Kentucky
Laurens County:  Georgia; South Carolina
Lavaca County, Texas
Lawrence County:  Alabama; Arkansas; Illinois; Indiana; Kentucky; Mississippi; Missouri; Ohio; Pennsylvania; South Dakota; Tennessee
Le Flore County, Oklahoma
Le Sueur County, Minnesota
Lea County, New Mexico
Leake County, Mississippi
Leavenworth County, Kansas
Lebanon County, Pennsylvania
Lee County:  Alabama; Arkansas; Florida; Georgia; Illinois; Iowa; Kentucky; Mississippi; North Carolina; South Carolina; Texas; Virginia
Leelanau County, Michigan
Leflore County, Mississippi
Lehigh County, Pennsylvania
Lemhi County, Idaho
Lenawee County, Michigan
Lenoir County, North Carolina
Leon County:  Florida; Texas
Leslie County, Kentucky
Letcher County, Kentucky
Levy County, Florida
Lewis County:  Idaho; Kentucky; Missouri; New York; Tennessee; Washington; West Virginia
Lewis and Clark County, Montana
Lexington County, South Carolina
Liberty County:  Florida; Georgia; Montana; Texas
Licking County, Ohio
Limestone County:  Alabama; Texas
Lincoln County:  Arkansas; Colorado; Georgia; Idaho; Kansas; Kentucky; Maine; Minnesota; Mississippi; Missouri; Montana; Nebraska; Nevada; New Mexico; North Carolina; Oklahoma; Oregon; South Dakota; Tennessee; Washington; West Virginia; Wisconsin; Wyoming
Lincoln Parish, Louisiana
Linn County:  Iowa; Kansas; Missouri; Oregon
Lipscomb County, Texas
Litchfield County, Connecticut
Little River County, Arkansas
Live Oak County, Texas
Livingston County:  Illinois; Kentucky; Michigan; Missouri; New York
Livingston Parish, Louisiana
Llano County, Texas
Logan County:  Arkansas; Colorado; Illinois; Kansas; Kentucky; Nebraska; North Dakota; Ohio; Oklahoma; West Virginia
Loíza Municipality, Puerto Rico
Long County, Georgia
Lonoke County, Arkansas
Lorain County, Ohio
Los Alamos County, New Mexico
Los Angeles County, California
Loudon County, Tennessee
Loudoun County, Virginia
Louisa County:  Iowa; Virginia
Loup County, Nebraska
Love County, Oklahoma
Loving County, Texas
Lowndes County:  Alabama; Georgia; Mississippi
Lubbock County, Texas
Lucas County:  Iowa; Ohio
Luce County, Michigan
Lumpkin County, Georgia
Luna County, New Mexico
Lunenburg County, Virginia
Luquillo Municipality, Puerto Rico
Luzerne County, Pennsylvania
Lycoming County, Pennsylvania
Lyman County, South Dakota
Lynn County, Texas
Lyon County:  Iowa; Kansas; Kentucky; Minnesota; Nevada

M

Mackinac County, Michigan
Macomb County, Michigan
Macon County:  Alabama; Georgia; Illinois; Missouri; North Carolina; Tennessee
Macoupin County, Illinois
Madera County, California
Madison County:  Alabama; Arkansas; Florida; Georgia; Idaho; Illinois; Indiana; Iowa; Kentucky; Mississippi; Missouri; Montana; Nebraska; New York; North Carolina; Ohio; Tennessee; Texas; Virginia
Madison Parish, Louisiana
Magoffin County, Kentucky
Mahaska County, Iowa
Mahnomen County, Minnesota
Mahoning County, Ohio
Major County, Oklahoma
Malheur County, Oregon
Manatee County, Florida
Manatí Municipality, Puerto Rico
Manistee County, Michigan
Manitowoc County, Wisconsin
Manu'a District, American Samoa
Marathon County, Wisconsin
Marengo County, Alabama
Maricao Municipality, Puerto Rico
Maricopa County, Arizona
Maries County, Missouri
Marin County, California
Marinette County, Wisconsin
Marion County:  Alabama; Arkansas; Florida; Georgia; Illinois; Indiana; Iowa; Kansas; Kentucky; Mississippi; Missouri; Ohio; Oregon; South Carolina; Tennessee; Texas; West Virginia
Mariposa County, California
Marlboro County, South Carolina
Marquette County:  Michigan; Wisconsin
Marshall County:  Alabama; Illinois; Indiana; Iowa; Kansas; Kentucky; Minnesota; Mississippi; Oklahoma; South Dakota; Tennessee; West Virginia
Martin County:  Florida; Indiana; Kentucky; Minnesota; North Carolina; Texas
Mason County:  Illinois; Kentucky; Michigan; Texas; Washington; West Virginia
Massac County, Illinois
Matagorda County, Texas
Matanuska-Susitna Borough, Alaska
Mathews County, Virginia
Maui County, Hawaii
Maunabo Municipality, Puerto Rico
Maury County, Tennessee
Maverick County, Texas
Mayagüez Municipality, Puerto Rico
Mayes County, Oklahoma
McClain County, Oklahoma
McCone County, Montana
McCook County, South Dakota
McCormick County, South Carolina
McCracken County, Kentucky
McCreary County, Kentucky
McCulloch County, Texas
McCurtain County, Oklahoma
McDonald County, Missouri
McDonough County, Illinois
McDowell County:  North Carolina; West Virginia
McDuffie County, Georgia
McHenry County:  Illinois; North Dakota
McIntosh County:  Georgia; North Dakota; Oklahoma
McKean County, Pennsylvania
McKenzie County, North Dakota
McKinley County, New Mexico
McLean County:  Illinois; Kentucky; North Dakota
McLennan County, Texas
McLeod County, Minnesota
McMinn County, Tennessee
McMullen County, Texas
McNairy County, Tennessee
McPherson County:  Kansas; Nebraska; South Dakota
Meade County:  Kansas; Kentucky; South Dakota
Meagher County, Montana
Mecklenburg County:  North Carolina; Virginia
Mecosta County, Michigan
Medina County:  Ohio; Texas
Meeker County, Minnesota
Meigs County:  Ohio; Tennessee
Mellette County, South Dakota
Menard County:  Illinois; Texas
Mendocino County, California
Menifee County, Kentucky
Menominee County:  Michigan; Wisconsin
Merced County, California
Mercer County:  Illinois; Kentucky; Missouri; New Jersey; North Dakota; Ohio; Pennsylvania; West Virginia
Meriwether County, Georgia
Merrick County, Nebraska
Merrimack County, New Hampshire
Mesa County, Colorado
Metcalfe County, Kentucky
Miami County:  Indiana; Kansas; Ohio
Miami-Dade County, Florida
Middlesex County:  Connecticut; Massachusetts; New Jersey; Virginia
Midland County:  Michigan; Texas
Midway Atoll, U.S. Minor Outlying Islands
Mifflin County, Pennsylvania
Milam County, Texas
Millard County, Utah
Mille Lacs County, Minnesota
Miller County:  Arkansas; Georgia; Missouri
Mills County:  Iowa; Texas
Milwaukee County, Wisconsin
Miner County, South Dakota
Mineral County:  Colorado; Montana; Nevada; West Virginia
Mingo County, West Virginia
Minidoka County, Idaho
Minnehaha County, South Dakota
Missaukee County, Michigan
Mississippi County:  Arkansas; Missouri
Missoula County, Montana
Mitchell County:  Georgia; Iowa; Kansas; North Carolina; Texas
Mobile County, Alabama
Moca Municipality, Puerto Rico
Modoc County, California
Moffat County, Colorado
Mohave County, Arizona
Moniteau County, Missouri
Monmouth County, New Jersey
Mono County, California
Monona County, Iowa
Monongalia County, West Virginia
Monroe County:  Alabama; Arkansas; Florida; Georgia; Illinois; Indiana; Iowa; Kentucky; Michigan; Mississippi; Missouri; New York; Ohio; Pennsylvania; Tennessee; West Virginia; Wisconsin
Montague County, Texas
Montcalm County, Michigan
Monterey County, California
Montezuma County, Colorado
Montgomery County:  Alabama; Arkansas; Georgia; Illinois; Indiana; Iowa; Kansas; Kentucky; Maryland; Mississippi; Missouri; New York; North Carolina; Ohio; Pennsylvania; Tennessee; Texas; Virginia
Montmorency County, Michigan
Montour County, Pennsylvania
Montrose County, Colorado
Moody County, South Dakota
Moore County:  North Carolina; Tennessee; Texas
Mora County, New Mexico
Morehouse Parish, Louisiana
Morgan County:  Alabama; Colorado; Georgia; Illinois; Indiana; Kentucky; Missouri; Ohio; Tennessee; Utah; West Virginia
Morovis Municipality, Puerto Rico
Morrill County, Nebraska
Morris County:  Kansas; New Jersey; Texas
Morrison County, Minnesota
Morrow County:  Ohio; Oregon
Morton County:  Kansas; North Dakota
Motley County, Texas
Moultrie County, Illinois
Mountrail County, North Dakota
Mower County, Minnesota
Muhlenberg County, Kentucky
Multnomah County, Oregon
Murray County:  Georgia; Minnesota; Oklahoma
Muscatine County, Iowa
Muscogee County, Georgia
Muskegon County, Michigan
Muskingum County, Ohio
Muskogee County, Oklahoma
Musselshell County, Montana

N

Nacogdoches County, Texas
Naguabo Municipality, Puerto Rico
Nance County, Nebraska
Town and County of Nantucket, Massachusetts
Napa County, California
Naranjito Municipality, Puerto Rico
Nash County, North Carolina
Nassau County:  Florida; New York
Natchitoches Parish, Louisiana
Natrona County, Wyoming
Navajo County, Arizona
Navarro County, Texas
Navassa Island, U.S. Minor Outlying Islands
Nelson County:  Kentucky; North Dakota; Virginia
Nemaha County:  Kansas; Nebraska
Neosho County, Kansas
Neshoba County, Mississippi
Ness County, Kansas
Nevada County:  Arkansas; California
New Castle County, Delaware
New Hanover County, North Carolina
New Haven County, Connecticut
New Kent County, Virginia
New London County, Connecticut
New Madrid County, Missouri
New York County, New York
Newaygo County, Michigan
Newberry County, South Carolina
Newport County, Rhode Island
Newton County:  Arkansas; Georgia; Indiana; Mississippi; Missouri; Texas
Nez Perce County, Idaho
Niagara County, New York
Nicholas County:  Kentucky; West Virginia
Nicollet County, Minnesota
Niobrara County, Wyoming
Noble County:  Indiana; Ohio; Oklahoma
Nobles County, Minnesota
Nodaway County, Missouri
Nolan County, Texas
Nome Census Area, Alaska
Norfolk County, Massachusetts
Norman County, Minnesota
North Slope Borough, Alaska
Northampton County:  North Carolina; Pennsylvania; Virginia
Northern Islands Municipality, Northern Mariana Islands
Northumberland County:  Pennsylvania; Virginia
Northwest Arctic Borough, Alaska
Norton County, Kansas
Nottoway County, Virginia
Nowata County, Oklahoma
Noxubee County, Mississippi
Nuckolls County, Nebraska
Nueces County, Texas
Nye County, Nevada

O

O'Brien County, Iowa
Oakland County, Michigan
Obion County, Tennessee
Ocean County, New Jersey
Oceana County, Michigan
Ochiltree County, Texas
Oconee County:  Georgia; South Carolina
Oconto County, Wisconsin
Ogemaw County, Michigan
Oglala Lakota County, South Dakota
Ogle County, Illinois
Oglethorpe County, Georgia
Ohio County:  Indiana; Kentucky; West Virginia
Okaloosa County, Florida
Okanogan County, Washington
Okeechobee County, Florida
Okfuskee County, Oklahoma
Oklahoma County, Oklahoma
Okmulgee County, Oklahoma
Oktibbeha County, Mississippi
Oldham County:  Kentucky; Texas
Oliver County, North Dakota
Olmsted County, Minnesota
Oneida County:  Idaho; New York; Wisconsin
Onondaga County, New York
Onslow County, North Carolina
Ontario County, New York
Ontonagon County, Michigan
Orange County:  California; Florida; Indiana; New York; North Carolina; Texas; Vermont; Virginia
Orangeburg County, South Carolina
Oregon County, Missouri
Orleans County:  New York; Vermont
Orleans Parish, Louisiana
Orocovis Municipality, Puerto Rico
Osage County:  Kansas; Missouri; Oklahoma
Osborne County, Kansas
Osceola County:  Florida; Iowa; Michigan
Oscoda County, Michigan
Oswego County, New York
Otero County:  Colorado; New Mexico
Otoe County, Nebraska
Otsego County:  Michigan; New York
Ottawa County:  Kansas; Michigan; Ohio; Oklahoma
Otter Tail County, Minnesota
Ouachita County, Arkansas
Ouachita Parish, Louisiana
Ouray County, Colorado
Outagamie County, Wisconsin
Overton County, Tennessee
Owen County:  Indiana; Kentucky
Owsley County, Kentucky
Owyhee County, Idaho
Oxford County, Maine
Ozark County, Missouri
Ozaukee County, Wisconsin

P

Pacific County, Washington
Page County:  Iowa; Virginia
Palm Beach County, Florida
Palmyra Atoll, U.S. Minor Outlying Islands
Palo Alto County, Iowa
Palo Pinto County, Texas
Pamlico County, North Carolina
Panola County:  Mississippi; Texas
Park County:  Colorado; Montana; Wyoming
Parke County, Indiana
Parker County, Texas
Parmer County, Texas
Pasco County, Florida
Pasquotank County, North Carolina
Passaic County, New Jersey
Patillas Municipality, Puerto Rico
Patrick County, Virginia
Paulding County:  Georgia; Ohio
Pawnee County:  Kansas; Nebraska; Oklahoma
Payette County, Idaho
Payne County, Oklahoma
Peach County, Georgia
Pearl River County, Mississippi
Pecos County, Texas
Pembina County, North Dakota
Pemiscot County, Missouri
Pend Oreille County, Washington
Pender County, North Carolina
Pendleton County:  Kentucky; West Virginia
Pennington County:  Minnesota; South Dakota
Penobscot County, Maine
Peñuelas Municipality, Puerto Rico
Peoria County, Illinois
Pepin County, Wisconsin
Perkins County:  Nebraska; South Dakota
Perquimans County, North Carolina
Perry County:  Alabama; Arkansas; Illinois; Indiana; Kentucky; Mississippi; Missouri; Ohio; Pennsylvania; Tennessee
Pershing County, Nevada
Person County, North Carolina
Petersburg Borough, Alaska
Petroleum County, Montana
Pettis County, Missouri
Phelps County:  Missouri; Nebraska
Philadelphia County, Pennsylvania
Phillips County:  Arkansas; Colorado; Kansas; Montana
Piatt County, Illinois
Pickaway County, Ohio
Pickens County:  Alabama; Georgia; South Carolina
Pickett County, Tennessee
Pierce County:  Georgia; Nebraska; North Dakota; Washington; Wisconsin
Pike County:  Alabama; Arkansas; Georgia; Illinois; Indiana; Kentucky; Mississippi; Missouri; Ohio; Pennsylvania
Pima County, Arizona
Pinal County, Arizona
Pine County, Minnesota
Pinellas County, Florida
Pipestone County, Minnesota
Piscataquis County, Maine
Pitkin County, Colorado
Pitt County, North Carolina
Pittsburg County, Oklahoma
Pittsylvania County, Virginia
Piute County, Utah
Placer County, California
Plaquemines Parish, Louisiana
Platte County:  Missouri; Nebraska; Wyoming
Pleasants County, West Virginia
Plumas County, California
Plymouth County:  Iowa; Massachusetts
Pocahontas County:  Iowa; West Virginia
Poinsett County, Arkansas
Pointe Coupee Parish, Louisiana
Polk County:  Arkansas; Florida; Georgia; Iowa; Minnesota; Missouri; Nebraska; North Carolina; Oregon; Tennessee; Texas; Wisconsin
Ponce Municipality, Puerto Rico
Pondera County, Montana
Pontotoc County:  Mississippi; Oklahoma
Pope County:  Arkansas; Illinois; Minnesota
Portage County:  Ohio; Wisconsin
Porter County, Indiana
Posey County, Indiana
Pottawatomie County:  Kansas; Oklahoma
Pottawattamie County, Iowa
Potter County:  Pennsylvania; South Dakota; Texas
Powder River County, Montana
Powell County:  Kentucky; Montana
Power County, Idaho
Poweshiek County, Iowa
Powhatan County, Virginia
Prairie County:  Arkansas; Montana
Pratt County, Kansas
Preble County, Ohio
Prentiss County, Mississippi
Presidio County, Texas
Presque Isle County, Michigan
Preston County, West Virginia
Price County, Wisconsin
Prince Edward County, Virginia
Prince George County, Virginia
Prince George's County, Maryland
Prince William County, Virginia
Prince of Wales – Hyder Census Area, Alaska
Providence County, Rhode Island
Prowers County, Colorado
Pueblo County, Colorado
Pulaski County:  Arkansas; Georgia; Illinois; Indiana; Kentucky; Missouri; Virginia
Pushmataha County, Oklahoma
Putnam County:  Florida; Georgia; Illinois; Indiana; Missouri; New York; Ohio; Tennessee; West Virginia

Q
Quay County, New Mexico
Quebradillas Municipality, Puerto Rico
Queen Anne's County, Maryland
Queens County, New York
Quitman County:  Georgia; Mississippi

R

Rabun County, Georgia
Racine County, Wisconsin
Rains County, Texas
Raleigh County, West Virginia
Ralls County, Missouri
Ramsey County:  Minnesota; North Dakota
Randall County, Texas
Randolph County:  Alabama; Arkansas; Georgia; Illinois; Indiana; Missouri; North Carolina; West Virginia
Rankin County, Mississippi
Ransom County, North Dakota
Rapides Parish, Louisiana
Rappahannock County, Virginia
Ravalli County, Montana
Rawlins County, Kansas
Ray County, Missouri
Reagan County, Texas
Real County, Texas
Red Lake County, Minnesota
Red River County, Texas
Red River Parish, Louisiana
Red Willow County, Nebraska
Redwood County, Minnesota
Reeves County, Texas
Refugio County, Texas
Reno County, Kansas
Rensselaer County, New York
Renville County:  Minnesota; North Dakota
Republic County, Kansas
Reynolds County, Missouri
Rhea County, Tennessee
Rice County:  Kansas; Minnesota
Rich County, Utah
Richardson County, Nebraska
Richland County:  Illinois; Montana; North Dakota; Ohio; South Carolina; Wisconsin
Richland Parish, Louisiana
Richmond County:  Georgia; New York; North Carolina; Virginia
Riley County, Kansas
Rincón Municipality, Puerto Rico
Ringgold County, Iowa
Rio Arriba County, New Mexico
Rio Blanco County, Colorado
Rio Grande County, Colorado
Río Grande Municipality, Puerto Rico
Ripley County:  Indiana; Missouri
Ritchie County, West Virginia
Riverside County, California
Roane County:  Tennessee; West Virginia
Roanoke County, Virginia
Roberts County:  South Dakota; Texas
Robertson County:  Kentucky; Tennessee; Texas
Robeson County, North Carolina
Rock County:  Minnesota; Nebraska; Wisconsin
Rock Island County, Illinois
Rockbridge County, Virginia
Rockcastle County, Kentucky
Rockdale County, Georgia
Rockingham County:  New Hampshire; North Carolina; Virginia
Rockland County, New York
Rockwall County, Texas
Roger Mills County, Oklahoma
Rogers County, Oklahoma
Rolette County, North Dakota
Rooks County, Kansas
Roosevelt County:  Montana; New Mexico
Roscommon County, Michigan
Rose Atoll, American Samoa
Roseau County, Minnesota
Rosebud County, Montana
Ross County, Ohio
Rota Municipality, Northern Mariana Islands
Routt County, Colorado
Rowan County:  Kentucky; North Carolina
Runnels County, Texas
Rush County:  Indiana; Kansas
Rusk County:  Texas; Wisconsin
Russell County:  Alabama; Kansas; Kentucky; Virginia
Rutherford County:  North Carolina; Tennessee
Rutland County, Vermont

S

Sabana Grande Municipality, Puerto Rico
Sabine County, Texas
Sabine Parish, Louisiana
Sac County, Iowa
Sacramento County, California
Sagadahoc County, Maine
Saginaw County, Michigan
Saguache County, Colorado
Saint Bernard Parish, Louisiana
Saint Charles County, Missouri
Saint Charles Parish, Louisiana
Saint Clair County: Alabama; Illinois; Michigan; Missouri
Saint Croix County, Wisconsin
Saint Croix Island, U.S. Virgin Islands
Saint Francis County, Arkansas
Saint Francois County, Missouri
Saint Helena Parish, Louisiana
Saint James Parish, Louisiana
Saint John Island, U.S. Virgin Islands
Saint John the Baptist Parish, Louisiana
Saint Johns County, Florida
Saint Joseph County:  Indiana; Michigan
Saint Landry Parish, Louisiana
Saint Lawrence County, New York
Saint Louis County:  Minnesota; Missouri
Saint Lucie County, Florida
Saint Martin Parish, Louisiana
Saint Mary Parish, Louisiana
Saint Mary's County, Maryland
Saint Tammany Parish, Louisiana
Saint Thomas Island, U.S. Virgin Islands
Sainte Genevieve County, Missouri
Saipan Municipality, Northern Mariana Islands
Salem County, New Jersey
Salinas Municipality, Puerto Rico
Saline County:  Arkansas; Illinois; Kansas; Missouri; Nebraska
Salt Lake County, Utah
Saluda County, South Carolina
Sampson County, North Carolina
San Augustine County, Texas
San Benito County, California
San Bernardino County, California
San Diego County, California
City and County of San Francisco, California
San Germán Municipality, Puerto Rico
San Jacinto County, Texas
San Joaquin County, California
San Juan County:  Colorado; New Mexico; Utah; Washington
San Juan Municipality, Puerto Rico
San Lorenzo Municipality, Puerto Rico
San Luis Obispo County, California
San Mateo County, California
San Miguel County:  Colorado; New Mexico
San Patricio County, Texas
San Saba County, Texas
San Sebastián Municipality, Puerto Rico
Sanborn County, South Dakota
Sanders County, Montana
Sandoval County, New Mexico
Sandusky County, Ohio
Sangamon County, Illinois
Sanilac County, Michigan
Sanpete County, Utah
Santa Barbara County, California
Santa Clara County, California
Santa Cruz County:  Arizona; California
Santa Fe County, New Mexico
Santa Isabel Municipality, Puerto Rico
Santa Rosa County, Florida
Sarasota County, Florida
Saratoga County, New York
Sargent County, North Dakota
Sarpy County, Nebraska
Sauk County, Wisconsin
Saunders County, Nebraska
Sawyer County, Wisconsin
Schenectady County, New York
Schleicher County, Texas
Schley County, Georgia
Schoharie County, New York
Schoolcraft County, Michigan
Schuyler County:  Illinois; Missouri; New York
Schuylkill County, Pennsylvania
Scioto County, Ohio
Scotland County:  Missouri; North Carolina
Scott County:  Arkansas; Illinois; Indiana; Iowa; Kansas; Kentucky; Minnesota; Mississippi; Missouri; Tennessee; Virginia
Scotts Bluff County, Nebraska
Screven County, Georgia
Scurry County, Texas
Searcy County, Arkansas
Sebastian County, Arkansas
Sedgwick County:  Colorado; Kansas
Seminole County:  Florida; Georgia; Oklahoma
Seneca County:  New York; Ohio
Sequatchie County, Tennessee
Sequoyah County, Oklahoma
Sevier County:  Arkansas; Tennessee; Utah
Seward County:  Kansas; Nebraska
Shackelford County, Texas
Shannon County, Missouri
Sharkey County, Mississippi
Sharp County, Arkansas
Shasta County, California
Shawano County, Wisconsin
Shawnee County, Kansas
Sheboygan County, Wisconsin
Shelby County:  Alabama; Illinois; Indiana; Iowa; Kentucky; Missouri; Ohio; Tennessee; Texas
Shenandoah County, Virginia
Sherburne County, Minnesota
Sheridan County:  Kansas; Montana; Nebraska; North Dakota; Wyoming
Sherman County:  Kansas; Nebraska; Oregon; Texas
Shiawassee County, Michigan
Shoshone County, Idaho
Sibley County, Minnesota
Sierra County:  California; New Mexico
Silver Bow County, Montana
Simpson County:  Kentucky; Mississippi
Sioux County:  Iowa; Nebraska; North Dakota
Siskiyou County, California
Sitka, Alaska
Skagit County, Washington
Skagway-Hoonah-Angoon Census Area, Alaska
Skamania County, Washington
Slope County, North Dakota
Smith County:  Kansas; Mississippi; Tennessee; Texas
Smyth County, Virginia
Snohomish County, Washington
Snyder County, Pennsylvania
Socorro County, New Mexico
Solano County, California
Somerset County:  Maine; Maryland; New Jersey; Pennsylvania
Somervell County, Texas
Sonoma County, California
Southampton County, Virginia
Southeast Fairbanks Census Area, Alaska
Spalding County, Georgia
Spartanburg County, South Carolina
Spencer County:  Indiana; Kentucky
Spink County, South Dakota
Spokane County, Washington
Spotsylvania County, Virginia
Stafford County:  Kansas; Virginia
Stanislaus County, California
Stanley County, South Dakota
Stanly County, North Carolina
Stanton County:  Kansas; Nebraska
Stark County:  Illinois; North Dakota; Ohio
Starke County, Indiana
Starr County, Texas
Stearns County, Minnesota
Steele County:  Minnesota; North Dakota
Stephens County:  Georgia; Oklahoma; Texas
Stephenson County, Illinois
Sterling County, Texas
Steuben County:  Indiana; New York
Stevens County:  Kansas; Minnesota; Washington
Stewart County:  Georgia; Tennessee
Stillwater County, Montana
Stoddard County, Missouri
Stokes County, North Carolina
Stone County:  Arkansas; Mississippi; Missouri
Stonewall County, Texas
Storey County, Nevada
Story County, Iowa
Strafford County, New Hampshire
Stutsman County, North Dakota
Sublette County, Wyoming
Suffolk County:  Massachusetts; New York
Sullivan County:  Indiana; Missouri; New Hampshire; New York; Pennsylvania; Tennessee
Sully County, South Dakota
Summers County, West Virginia
Summit County:  Colorado; Ohio; Utah
Sumner County:  Kansas; Tennessee
Sumter County:  Alabama; Florida; Georgia; South Carolina
Sunflower County, Mississippi
Surry County:  North Carolina; Virginia
Susquehanna County, Pennsylvania
Sussex County:  Delaware; New Jersey; Virginia
Sutter County, California
Sutton County, Texas
Suwannee County, Florida
Swain County, North Carolina
Swains Island, American Samoa
Sweet Grass County, Montana
Sweetwater County, Wyoming
Swift County, Minnesota
Swisher County, Texas
Switzerland County, Indiana

T

Talbot County:  Georgia; Maryland
Taliaferro County, Georgia
Talladega County, Alabama
Tallahatchie County, Mississippi
Tallapoosa County, Alabama
Tama County, Iowa
Taney County, Missouri
Tangipahoa Parish, Louisiana
Taos County, New Mexico
Tarrant County, Texas
Tate County, Mississippi
Tattnall County, Georgia
Taylor County:  Florida; Georgia; Iowa; Kentucky; Texas; West Virginia; Wisconsin
Tazewell County:  Illinois; Virginia
Tehama County, California
Telfair County, Georgia
Teller County, Colorado
Tensas Parish, Louisiana
Terrebonne Parish, Louisiana
Terrell County:  Georgia; Texas
Terry County, Texas
Teton County:  Idaho; Montana; Wyoming
Texas County:  Missouri; Oklahoma
Thayer County, Nebraska
Thomas County:  Georgia; Kansas; Nebraska
Throckmorton County, Texas
Thurston County:  Nebraska; Washington
Tift County, Georgia
Tillamook County, Oregon
Tillman County, Oklahoma
Tinian Municipality, Northern Mariana Islands
Tioga County:  New York; Pennsylvania
Tippah County, Mississippi
Tippecanoe County, Indiana
Tipton County:  Indiana; Tennessee
Tishomingo County, Mississippi
Titus County, Texas
Toa Alta Municipality, Puerto Rico
Toa Baja Municipality, Puerto Rico
Todd County:  Kentucky; Minnesota; South Dakota
Tolland County, Connecticut
Tom Green County, Texas
Tompkins County, New York
Tooele County, Utah
Toole County, Montana
Toombs County, Georgia
Torrance County, New Mexico
Towner County, North Dakota
Towns County, Georgia
Traill County, North Dakota
Transylvania County, North Carolina
Traverse County, Minnesota
Travis County, Texas
Treasure County, Montana
Trego County, Kansas
Trempealeau County, Wisconsin
Treutlen County, Georgia
Trigg County, Kentucky
Trimble County, Kentucky
Trinity County:  California; Texas
Tripp County, South Dakota
Troup County, Georgia
Trousdale County, Tennessee
Trujillo Alto Municipality, Puerto Rico
Trumbull County, Ohio
Tucker County, West Virginia
Tulare County, California
Tulsa County, Oklahoma
Tunica County, Mississippi
Tuolumne County, California
Turner County:  Georgia; South Dakota
Tuscaloosa County, Alabama
Tuscarawas County, Ohio
Tuscola County, Michigan
Twiggs County, Georgia
Twin Falls County, Idaho
Tyler County:  Texas; West Virginia
Tyrrell County, North Carolina

U

Uinta County, Wyoming
Uintah County, Utah
Ulster County, New York
Umatilla County, Oregon
Unicoi County, Tennessee
Union County:  Arkansas; Florida; Georgia; Illinois; Indiana; Iowa; Kentucky; Mississippi; New Jersey; New Mexico; North Carolina; Ohio; Oregon; Pennsylvania; South Carolina; South Dakota; Tennessee
Union Parish, Louisiana
Upshur County:  Texas; West Virginia
Upson County, Georgia
Upton County, Texas
Utah County, Utah
Utuado Municipality, Puerto Rico
Uvalde County, Texas

V

Val Verde County, Texas
Valencia County, New Mexico
Valley County:  Idaho; Montana; Nebraska
Van Buren County:  Arkansas; Iowa; Michigan; Tennessee
Van Wert County, Ohio
Van Zandt County, Texas
Vance County, North Carolina
Vanderburgh County, Indiana
Vega Alta Municipality, Puerto Rico
Vega Baja Municipality, Puerto Rico
Venango County, Pennsylvania
Ventura County, California
Vermilion County, Illinois
Vermilion Parish, Louisiana
Vermillion County, Indiana
Vernon County:  Missouri; Wisconsin
Vernon Parish, Louisiana
Victoria County, Texas
Vieques Municipality, Puerto Rico
Vigo County, Indiana
Vilas County, Wisconsin
Villalba Municipality, Puerto Rico
Vinton County, Ohio
Volusia County, Florida

W

Wabash County:  Illinois; Indiana
Wabasha County, Minnesota
Wabaunsee County, Kansas
Wadena County, Minnesota
Wagoner County, Oklahoma
Wahkiakum County, Washington
Wake County, North Carolina
Wake Island, U.S. Minor Outlying Islands
Wakulla County, Florida
Waldo County, Maine
Walker County:  Alabama; Georgia; Texas
Walla Walla County, Washington
Wallace County, Kansas
Waller County, Texas
Wallowa County, Oregon
Walsh County, North Dakota
Walthall County, Mississippi
Walton County:  Florida; Georgia
Walworth County:  South Dakota; Wisconsin
Wapello County, Iowa
Ward County:  North Dakota; Texas
Ware County, Georgia
Warren County:  Georgia; Illinois; Indiana; Iowa; Kentucky; Mississippi; Missouri; New Jersey; New York; North Carolina; Ohio; Pennsylvania; Tennessee; Virginia
Warrick County, Indiana
Wasatch County, Utah
Wasco County, Oregon
Waseca County, Minnesota
Washakie County, Wyoming
Washburn County, Wisconsin
Washington County:  Alabama; Arkansas; Colorado; Florida; Georgia; Idaho; Illinois; Indiana; Iowa; Kansas; Kentucky; Maine; Maryland; Minnesota; Mississippi; Missouri; Nebraska; New York; North Carolina; Ohio; Oklahoma; Oregon; Pennsylvania; Rhode Island; Tennessee; Texas; Utah; Vermont; Virginia; Wisconsin
Washington Parish, Louisiana
Washita County, Oklahoma
Washoe County, Nevada
Washtenaw County, Michigan
Watauga County, North Carolina
Watonwan County, Minnesota
Waukesha County, Wisconsin
Waupaca County, Wisconsin
Waushara County, Wisconsin
Wayne County:  Georgia; Illinois; Indiana; Iowa; Kentucky; Michigan; Mississippi; Missouri; Nebraska; New York; North Carolina; Ohio; Pennsylvania; Tennessee; Utah; West Virginia
Weakley County, Tennessee
Webb County, Texas
Weber County, Utah
Webster County:  Georgia; Iowa; Kentucky; Mississippi; Missouri; Nebraska; West Virginia
Webster Parish, Louisiana
Weld County, Colorado
Wells County:  Indiana; North Dakota
West Baton Rouge Parish, Louisiana
West Carroll Parish, Louisiana
West Feliciana Parish, Louisiana
Westchester County, New York
Western District, American Samoa
Westmoreland County:  Pennsylvania; Virginia
Weston County, Wyoming
Wetzel County, West Virginia
Wexford County, Michigan
Wharton County, Texas
Whatcom County, Washington
Wheatland County, Montana
Wheeler County:  Georgia; Nebraska; Oregon; Texas
White County:  Arkansas; Georgia; Illinois; Indiana; Tennessee
White Pine County, Nevada
Whiteside County, Illinois
Whitfield County, Georgia
Whitley County:  Indiana; Kentucky
Whitman County, Washington
Wibaux County, Montana
Wichita County:  Kansas; Texas
Wicomico County, Maryland
Wilbarger County, Texas
Wilcox County:  Alabama; Georgia
Wilkes County:  Georgia; North Carolina
Wilkin County, Minnesota
Wilkinson County:  Georgia; Mississippi
Will County, Illinois
Willacy County, Texas
Williams County:  North Dakota; Ohio
Williamsburg County, South Carolina
Williamson County:  Illinois; Tennessee; Texas
Wilson County:  Kansas; North Carolina; Tennessee; Texas
Windham County:  Connecticut; Vermont
Windsor County, Vermont
Winkler County, Texas
Winn Parish, Louisiana
Winnebago County:  Illinois; Iowa; Wisconsin
Winneshiek County, Iowa
Winona County, Minnesota
Winston County:  Alabama; Mississippi
Wirt County, West Virginia
Wise County:  Texas; Virginia
Wolfe County, Kentucky
Wood County:  Ohio; Texas; West Virginia; Wisconsin
Woodbury County, Iowa
Woodford County:  Illinois; Kentucky
Woodruff County, Arkansas
Woods County, Oklahoma
Woodson County, Kansas
Woodward County, Oklahoma
Worcester County:  Maryland; Massachusetts
Worth County:  Georgia; Iowa; Missouri
Wright County:  Iowa; Minnesota; Missouri
Wyandot County, Ohio
Wyandotte County, Kansas
Wyoming County:  New York; Pennsylvania; West Virginia
Wythe County, Virginia

Y

Yabucoa Municipality, Puerto Rico
Yadkin County, North Carolina
Yakima County, Washington
Yakutat City and Borough, Alaska
Yalobusha County, Mississippi
Yamhill County, Oregon
Yancey County, North Carolina
Yankton County, South Dakota
Yates County, New York
Yauco Municipality, Puerto Rico
Yavapai County, Arizona
Yazoo County, Mississippi
Yell County, Arkansas
Yellow Medicine County, Minnesota
Yellowstone County, Montana
Yoakum County, Texas
Yolo County, California
York County:  Maine; Nebraska; Pennsylvania; South Carolina; Virginia
Young County, Texas
Yuba County, California
Yukon–Koyukuk Census Area, Alaska
Yuma County:  Arizona; Colorado

Z
Zapata County, Texas
Zavala County, Texas
Ziebach County, South Dakota

References